Events from the year 2004 in Romania.

Incumbents
President: Ion Iliescu (until 20 December), Traian Băsescu (starting 20 December)
Prime Minister: 
 until 21 December: Adrian Năstase
 21 December-28 December: Eugen Bejinariu
 29 December: Călin Popescu-Tăriceanu

Events 
 26 March – Seven countries in Eastern Europe, including Romania, become official members of NATO.
 3 May – For the International Tennis Federation 2004 men's circuit, an event is held in Bucharest.
 14 to 16 May – The 2004 European Judo Championships are held in Bucharest.
 24 May – 18 people are killed and 13 seriously injured after a truck loaded with ammonium nitrate explodes in Mihăilești, Buzău County.
 6 June – First round of the local election.
 16 June – Prime Minister Adrian Năstase inaugurates works on the A3 motorway.
 20 June – Second round of the local election.
 13 to 29 August – At the 2004 Summer Olympics, Romanian athletes earn a total of 19 medals.
 27 October – A magnitude 6 earthquake strikes Vrancea County, without causing casualties and significant material damage. This is the strongest earthquake recorded in Romania in the 21st century at the time.
 28 November – First round of the presidential election: Adrian Năstase 40.97%, Traian Băsescu 33.86%.
 12 December – Second round of the presidential election designates Traian Băsescu winner (51.23%), thus being elected the third president of post-revolutionary Romania.
 28 December – The government led by newly appointed prime minister Călin Popescu-Tăriceanu is validated by the Romanian Parliament.

Births
 18 June – Giuliano Stroe, gymnast and bodybuilder
 15 September – David Popovici, Romanian competitive swimmer

Deaths

 7 March – Nicolae Cajal, physician and academic (born 1919).
 18 March – Radu Manicatide, engineer and aircraft constructor (born 1912).
 October – Virgil Bărbuceanu, equestrian who competed at the 1956 and 1960 Summer Olympics (born 1927).

See also
 
2004 in Europe
Romania in the Eurovision Song Contest 2004
Romania at the 2004 Summer Olympics
Romania at the 2004 Summer Paralympics

References

External links

2000s in Romania
 
Romania
Romania
Years of the 21st century in Romania